The Central African Republic is a landlocked country in Central Africa. Despite its significant mineral deposits and other resources, such as uranium reserves, crude oil, gold, diamonds, cobalt, lumber, and hydropower, as well as significant quantities of arable land, the Central African Republic is among the ten poorest countries in the world. , according to the Human Development Index (HDI), the country had the second lowest level of human development, ranking 187th out of 188 countries.

Notable firms 
This list includes notable companies with primary headquarters located in the country. The industry and sector follow the Industry Classification Benchmark taxonomy. Organizations which have ceased operations are included and noted as defunct.

See also 
 Economy of the Central African Republic

References 

 
 
Central African Republic